30 Seconds to Fame is an American television series that was shown on the Fox Network from July 17, 2002 to June 26, 2003, featuring a talent show where acts could only last up to 30 seconds each, regardless of any resolution to the act. The series was hosted by Craig Jackson.

Many different talents were exhibited, such as contortionism, juggling, magic tricks, stand-up comedy, and beatboxing, in addition to singing and dancing acts. Much of the charm of the show was derived from the fact that each act lasted only 30 seconds, leading to a variety of different acts being displayed. The live audience acted as the judges. During the performances, if the audience found an act undesirable to watch, they booed and used electronic devices to put in a vote for elimination, complete with an on-screen "Eliminator" scale graphic (colored in green, yellow, and red). If enough people did so (i.e. the "Eliminator" scale needle hit any part of the red area), the act was to be cut short, regardless of how much time was left on the clock.

At the end of the show, every member of the audience voted for his or her favorite act, and the top three acts got a chance to do another 30-second performance. After this, a final round of voting occurred, and the winner earned a cash prize of US$25,000.

The network began to rerun the series on their Saturday late night block in January 2011 in order to fill the half-hour after Fringe which was vacated by the canceled Running Wilde, until the launch of the Animation Domination High Definition block in July 2013; the late night timeslot was used for repurposed reruns of recent Fox series after Fox temporarily ending original late night programming in September 2010.

International versions
These versions are no longer airing.

In Indonesian version, Global TV picked this format which was distributed with FremantleMedia

References

External links
Official Website

20th Television franchises
2000s American game shows
2002 American television series debuts
2003 American television series endings
Fox Broadcasting Company original programming
2000s American variety television series
English-language television shows
Television series by 20th Century Fox Television